This article lists the episodes attributed to the anime version of MÄR: Märchen Awakens Romance. It aired in Japan between April 2005 and March 25, 2007, containing 102 episodes. The anime of MAR is an oddity among most anime in that it continued long after the manga had ended. Rather than follow what was originally set by the author, the anime expanded upon the source material by adding additional battles during the climax and having a somewhat different ending. The anime was licensed by Viz Media and aired on Cartoon Network's online broadband service Toonami Jetstream and, for a limited time, on their television programming block Toonami, until they stopped airing it for unknown reasons.

There are two firms known to have released the DVDs of the anime: Shogakukan for the Japanese DVDs and Viz Media for the English DVDs. In the Japanese DVDs, the original 102 episodes were divided into 17 DVDs, 3 episodes for each and 2 episodes for the 1st and 18th discs. There were also two extra merchandises in the 8th and 9th volumes. From episode 51, the DVDs were released as 'DVD Z'. The English DVDs were released on June 12, 2007, with 4 episodes for each DVD and a running time of 92 minutes. Four volumes were released, consisting of 16 episodes in total.

As of 2008, MÄR DVDs were delisted from distribution. According to Viz Media's spokesperson, this was done to make room for other titles' releases.

Twelve pieces of music were used throughout the series, four openings and eight endings. All of them are composed by the group Garnet Crow.

Episode list

Season 1

Season 2

Season 3

Season 4

References

External links
 

Episodes
Marchen Awakens Romance